USCGC Alder (WLB-216) is the final Juniper-class,  seagoing buoy tender of the United States Coast Guard.

Alder was built by Marinette Marine Corporation and launched on February 7, 2004. Alders maiden voyage was on September 12, 2004. From commissioning until August 2022, Alder was assigned to Duluth, Minnesota as its home port. Alder replaced the previous cutter stationed in Duluth, which retired after 60 years of service.  

In the Summer of 2021, Alder was temporarily relocated to Baltimore, Maryland for a yearlong maintenance period. In August 2022, she was reassigned to the San Francisco Bay area. Her duties in the Twin Ports of Duluth/Superior were  taken over by her sister tender .

Alder is designed as a multi-mission vessel, with its missions being Aids to Navigation, Icebreaking, Search and Rescue, Homeland Security, Law Enforcement, and Marine Environmental Protection.

She is under the operational control of the Commander of the Eleventh U.S. Coast Guard District and is home-ported at Yerba Buena Island in San Francisco, California. Her primary area of responsibility is the coastal waters, river bars and high seas from the California–Oregon border to San Diego, California. Alder conducts heavy lift aids-to-navigation operations, and law enforcement, homeland security, environmental pollution response, and search and rescue as directed.

Construction and characteristics
Alder is propelled by two Caterpillar diesel engines rated at 3,100 horsepower, and has a top speed of 16 knots. She has a single controllable-pitch propeller, which along with bow and stern thrusters allow the ship to be maneuvered to set buoys close offshore and in restricted waters. A dynamic global positioning system coupled with machinery plant controls and a chart display and information system allow station-keeping of the ship within a five-meter accuracy of the planned position without human intervention. The cutter has a 2,875 square foot buoy deck area with a crane used for servicing large ocean buoys.

Mission
USCGC Alder is a seagoing buoy tender with her primary mission being the servicing of aids-to navigation buoys in her area of responsibility (AOR). She services over 100 navigation buoys in her AOR as well as several National Oceanic and Atmospheric Administration (NOAA) data collection buoys. Alders other missions include maritime law enforcement, homeland security, ensuring the security of ports and waterways, maritime environmental response, as well as search and rescue duties.

History

2010s

Operation Nanook 2010
In August 2010 the guided missile destroyer  and USCGC Alder participated in Operation Nanook 2010 in Baffin Bay and the Davis Straits.
This was the fourth annual Operation Nanook organized by the Canadian Government, but it was the first to host foreign vessels.

References

External links
Official Web Page for USCGC Alder
Article Winter 2004 Article from North Star Port Magazine

USCGC Alder (WLB-216)
Ships of the United States Coast Guard
Juniper-class seagoing buoy tenders
2004 ships
Ships built by Marinette Marine